The 1900 United States presidential election in Florida was held on November 6, 1900. Florida voters chose four representatives, or electors to the Electoral College, who voted for President and Vice-President.

The anti-Southern animus of the Harrison presidency meant Florida‘s large landowners felt the disfranchisement of blacks was urgent by 1889. A poll tax was introduced in 1889 as were the so-called “Myers” and “Dortch” laws which required voters in more populous settlements to register their voting precincts. This dramatically cut voter registration amongst blacks and poorer whites, and since Florida completely lacked upland or German refugee whites opposed to secession, its Republican Party between 1872 and 1888 was entirely dependent upon black votes. Thus this disfranchisement of blacks and poor whites by a poll tax introduced in 1889 left Florida as devoid of Republican adherents as Louisiana, Mississippi or South Carolina. The Republican Party did not offer presidential electors in 1892, and it did not carry a single county in 1896.

With Bryan appealing to many pineywoods “crackers” who still paid the poll tax, he was able to improve upon his 1896 landslide. The power of Baptist preachers in the settled northern part of the state, however, did produce considerable support for the Prohibition Party’s John Woolley in the white counties.

The election saw William Jennings Bryan win the state and receive all four electoral votes. This stands as one of the ten occasions when third or minor parties got over 5% of the vote in Florida. This also marks the last time that an incumbent president has won reelection to a second full term without carrying the Sunshine State.

Results

Results by county

Notes

References 

Florida
1900 Florida elections
1900